Nidhi Sunil (born 1987/1988) is an Indian model, actress, and activist. Nidhi was born in Kerala and is known for her role as Samira in the Indian drama film Kaash (2015 film). Nidhi is a previous recipient of Vogue India's Model of the year award, and is currently one of L’Oréal's global ambassadors.

Background
Nidhi was born in Kochi and was brought up in Bengaluru, Karnataka, India. Her mother is Malayali, and her father is Kannadiga. She holds a law degree from Symbiosis Law School, and at the beginning of her career, worked as an environment lawyer.

Career
Nidhi started her career as an environment lawyer from Symbiosis Law School, Pune. In 2007, Nidhi competed in season four of Get Gorgeous and was placed second runner up. After that, she started her career as a model for national and international magazines like Vogue, QG  and Elle in India. She started her career as an actress in Bollywood with a drama film Gangoobai. In 2015 she appeared in his second film of career, Kaash. She has done campaigns for Garnier, The Gap, forever 21, esprit, and featured in editorials & covers of magazines including Italian Vogue, Indian Vogue, Harpers Bazaar, Elle Magazine and GQ.

She is currently signed to Premium model Management Paris. In February 2021, Nidhi was named L’Oréal's newest global ambassador  and was awarded Vogue India's model of the year 2021

Filmography

Discography

References

External links

Year of birth missing (living people)
Living people
Actresses from Kochi
Female models from Kerala
Actresses from Bangalore
Female models from Bangalore
Indian film actresses
Actresses in Hindi cinema
Actresses in Tamil cinema